The Zeppelin-Staaken R.XVI(Av) was a very large bomber (Riesenflugzeug), designed and built in Germany during 1918.

Development
The R.XVI, an incremental improvement to the Zeppelin-Staaken R.VI, was one of a series of large bombers called Riesenflugzeuge, intended to be less vulnerable than dirigibles in use at the time. The R.XVI had four engines in a push-pull configuration, mounted in nacelles large enough for some inflight maintenance by flight mechanics, housed in nacelles between the engines.

Three aircraft were ordered to be completed by Automobil & Aviatik A.G., at Leipzig-Heiterblick. Only two R.XVIs were completed and only one of these, (R.49), flew before the Armistice on 11 November 1918. The third R.XVI (R.51) was 3/4 complete at the Armistice but was never completed.

Operational history
Flight testing was carried out by R.49 during the war from September 1918, until a landing accident in October caused significant damage which was unlikely to have been repaired. The second aircraft, (R.50), was completed in 1919 as a civilian airliner, continuing the flight test programme until being flown to Döberitz for storage in November 1919.

Specifications (Zeppelin-Staaken R.XVI(Av))

Notes

References

A. K. Rohrbach, “Das 1000-PS Verkehrsflugzeug der Zeppelin-Werke, Staaken,” Zeitschrift für Flugtechnik und Motorluftschiffahrt, vol. 12, no. 1 (15 January 1921);
E. Offermann, W. G. Noack, and A. R. Weyl, Riesenflugzeuge, in: Handbuch der Flugzeugkunde (Richard Carl Schmidt & Co., 1927).
The German Giants by G.W. Haddow and Peter M. Grosz.

External links
 http://aeiou.iicm.tugraz.at/aeiou.film.f/f041a  A Zeppelin-Staaken R XIVa airplane lands in Aspern, 1919

Zeppelin-Staaken
1910s German bomber aircraft
Military aircraft of World War I
Pusher aircraft
Aircraft first flown in 1918